The women's individual archery event is one of 5 archery events held at the 2020 Summer Olympics. It is being held at Yumenoshima Park. There are 64 competitors from 40 nations, with each nation having either 1 or 3 archers.

Background

This is the 13th consecutive appearance of the event, which has been held every Games since archery returned to the Olympic program in 1972.

Five of the 8 quarterfinalists from the 2016 Games returned: silver medalist Lisa Unruh of Germany, fourth-place finisher Alejandra Valencia of Mexico, and quarterfinalists Tan Ya-ting of Chinese Taipei, Wu Jiaxin of China, and Naomi Folkard of Great Britain. Ranking round world record holder Kang Chae-young of Korea competed. The 2019 World Champion Lei Chien-ying joined Tan on the Chinese Taipei team (Kang was the bronze medalist).

Qualification 

64 archers qualify for the women's archery events. The 12 National Olympic Committees (NOCs) that qualify for the women's team event (including the host, Japan) enter the 3 team members in the individual event as well. Otherwise, NOCs may qualify a maximum of 1 archer in women's individual. There are quota spots available at various tournaments, including the World Championships, multiple continental events, and a final qualification tournament. There are also two Tripartite Commission invitational spots.

Competition format

As with the other archery events, the women's individual is a recurve archery event, held under the World Archery-approved 70-meter distance and rules. Competition begins with a ranking round, in which each archer shoots 72 arrows. The scores from the ranking round are used to seed the archers into a single-elimination bracket. The knockout matches use the set system introduced in 2012. Each match consists of up to 5 sets of 3 arrows per archer. The archer with the best score in each set wins the set, earning 2 points. If the score is tied, each archer receives 1 point. The first archer to score 6 points wins the match. If the match is tied 5-5 after 5 sets, a single tie-breaker arrow is to be used with the closest to center winning.

Records 
Prior to the competition, the world and Olympic records were as follows.

72 arrow ranking round

Schedule

The schedule for the women's individual event covers five separate days of competition.

All times are Japan Standard Time (UTC+9)

Results

Ranking round

The ranking round was held on 23 July 2021.

Competition bracket

Section 1

Section 2

Section 3

Section 4

Finals

References

Archery at the 2020 Summer Olympics
Women's events at the 2020 Summer Olympics